Rasterscan is a video game published in 1987 by Mastertronic for the ZX Spectrum, Commodore 64, Amstrad CPC, and MSX. It was written by Binary Design based in Parsonage Gardens, Manchester with the C64 version programmed by Phillip Allsopp.

Plot
The Rasterscan, a large damaged spacecraft, is drifting uncontrollably towards a nearby star. The Rasterscan can still be controlled and piloted to safety but only by a droid called MSB. Unfortunately, MSB is also damaged and (without help) can only repair toasters. The player needs to control MSB and, hopefully, use it to save the unfortunate spacecraft.

Gameplay
The player controls MSB, a spherical droid who can float through the interior of the ship in all directions. MSB can interact with the craft's machinery and instruments, which all serve a purpose. It also needs to solve logic-puzzles in order to open doors (different puzzles for each door) to allow it access to more parts of the spacecraft.

External links

Rasterscan at CPC WIKI

1987 video games
Amstrad CPC games
Binary Design games
Commodore 64 games
Mastertronic games
MSX games
Puzzle video games
Single-player video games
Video games developed in the United Kingdom
ZX Spectrum games